Wells is an unincorporated community in Ottawa County, Kansas, United States.  As of the 2020 census, the population of the community and nearby areas was 45.

History
The first post office in Wells was established in 1888 and was called Poe until 1892. It remained in operation until it closed in 1996.

Demographics

For statistical purposes, the United States Census Bureau has defined Wells as a census-designated place (CDP).

Education
The community is served by North Ottawa County USD 239 public school district.

References

Further reading

External links
 Ottawa County maps: Current, Historic, KDOT

Unincorporated communities in Ottawa County, Kansas
Unincorporated communities in Kansas